The Fergal Maher Cup is a hurling cup competition for Third-level Colleges. The Cup is awarded to the winners of the Tier 3 Championship (the Fitzgibbon Cup and Ryan Cup are the Tier 1 and Tier 2 Higher Education Hurling Championships).

The Fergal Maher Cup Championship is administered by Comhairle Ard Oideachais Cumann Lúthchleas Gael (CLG), the Gaelic Athletic Association's Higher Education Council which oversees Third-Level GAA championships. The GAA Higher Education Cup Championships are currently sponsored by the Electric Ireland  following on from the Irish Daily Mail, Ulster Bank, Datapac, Bus Éireann and Independent.ie.

History
The Cup is named in memory of Fergal Maher, a student and hurler at Dublin City University who hailed from Leixlip. Fergal was fatally injured when struck by a car near The Sheaf O'Wheat at Bracetown, Clonee, Co. Meath on 22 March 1998. At the time of his death Fergal Maher was a 2nd year engineering student at DCU and was Honorary Secretary of the DCU Hurling club. He played Ryan Cup hurling for DCU and at age 18 he captained the Kildare U21 hurling team.

The Cup was first presented for the Third Division Championship in 2002, the inaugural winner being Athlone Institute of Technology. In 2002/03 IT Tallaght achieved its maiden hurling title in this competition. King's Inns hurling club was launched in 2005 and in its first season won the trophy. The first President of the King's Inn Hurling Club was the President of the High Court (2001-2006), the Honourable Mr Justice Joseph Finnegan. In 2007/08 Edinburgh Napier University, winners of the British University Hurling Championship in both 2006/07 and 2007/08, became the first overseas winner of the Fergal Maher Cup.

Fergal Maher Tournament 2018-19

2018-19 Group A Qualifying

†Match never played
Qualifiers: St Mary's University College Belfast, Ulster University Coleraine

2018-19 Group B Qualifying

Qualifier: Marino Institute of Education

2018-19 Group C Qualifying

Cadets were drawn in this Group, but did not compete
Qualifier: Mary Immaculate College Thurles

2018-19 Finals

Roll of honour

Colleges by wins

Fergal Maher Cup Champion Colleges

 1987/88 N.I.H.E. Dublin
 1988/89 Tralee RTC
 1989/90 Dundalk RTC
 1990/91 Cadets
 1991/92 
 1992/93 Sligo RTC
 1993/94 Coláiste Phádraig Droim Conrach
 1994/95 Mary Immaculate College, Limerick
 1995/96 Coláiste Phádraig Droim Conrach
 1996/97 Dundalk RTC
 1997/98 UU Coleraine
 1998/99 Not held
 1999/00 Not held
 2000/01 Not held
 2001/02 Athlone IT
 2002/03 NUI Maynooth
 2003/04 GMIT Castlebar
 2004/05 IT Tallaght
 2005/06 King's Inns
 2006/07 IT Tallaght
 2007/08 Napier University, Edinburgh
 2008/09 St Mary's Univ.Coll./BMC
 2009/10 Napier University, Edinburgh
 2010/11 St Patrick' College, Thurles
 2011/12 LIT Tipperary
 2012/13 St Patrick's College, Thurles
 2013/14 IT Tallaght
 2014/15 Galway/Roscommon ETB
 2015/16 IT Sligo
 2016/17 G.M.I.T. Letterfrack
 2017/18 St Mary's University College, Belfast
 2018/19 St Mary's university College, Belfast
 2019/20 Cadets

Captains of winning teams

Man of The Match awardees

Finals listed by year

References

2002 establishments in Ireland
Hurling competitions at Irish universities
Hurling cup competitions